This is a list of notable people who are from Vaughan, Ontario, or who have spent a large or formative part of their career in that city.

A
Max Aitken – better known as First Baron Beaverbrook
Elizabeth Arden – founder of cosmetic company Elizabeth Arden, Inc.

B
Robert Barbieri – professional rugby player for Benetton Treviso and the Italian national team
Massimo Bertocchi – Olympic decathlete
Mark Bocek – UFC fighter

C
Luca Caputi – ice hockey player
Franklin Carmichael – Canadian artist and member of the Group of Seven
Jesse Carere – actor
Anthony Cirelli – hockey player
Andrew Cogliano – NHL player
Frank Corrado – National Hockey League player

D
Justin DiBenedetto – ice hockey player
Chris DiDomenico – ice hockey player
Phil Di Giuseppe – ice hockey player
Natalie Di Luccio – international multilingual singer
Sergio Di Zio – actor

E
Steve Eminger – hockey player

F
Danny Fernandes – singer

G 
 Duff Gibson – skeleton racer and gold medalist at the 2006 Winter Olympics

H
Mike Harris – 22nd Premier of Ontario

J
Mendelson Joe – artist raised in Maple
Franz Johnston – Canadian artist associated with the Group of Seven.

K
Gordon Kirkland – award-winning author and syndicated columnist
Marc Kielburger –  social entrepreneur, co-founder of WE Charity and Me to We 
Craig Kielburger –  social entrepreneur, co-founder of WE Charity and Me to We

L
Michael Liambas – ice hockey player
Arthur Lismer – English-Canadian painter, educator, and member of the Group of Seven

M
Adam Mascherin – hockey player
Tyler Medeiros – teen singer
Victor Mete – hockey player

N
Steve Nease – cartoonist

P
Al Palladini – politician
Russell Peters – international comedian; owns a house in Vaughan
Michael Petrasso – soccer player
Andi Petrillo – sports anchor
Dina Pugliese – television personality

R
Marco Reda – professional soccer player
David Rocco – actor and television cooking show host
Vince Rocco – ice hockey player

S
Roman Sadovsky – Canadian figure skater and two-time Junior Grand Prix Finalist
Denis Shapovalov – Israeli-Canadian tennis player
Martina Sorbara – lead singer and songwriter of Juno-Award-winning band Dragonette

T
Marco Terminesi – soccer player

V
Phil Varone – hockey player
Fred Varley – was a member of the Canadian Group of Seven artists.

W
Andrew Wiggins – professional basketball player

References

 
Vaughan
Vaughan